The 1994 Virginia Slims of Philadelphia was a women's tennis tournament played on indoor carpet courts at the Philadelphia Civic Center in Philadelphia, Pennsylvania in the United States that was part of the Tier I category of the 1994 WTA Tour. It was the 12th edition of the tournament and was held from November 7 through November 13, 1994. Sixth-seeded Anke Huber won the singles title and earned $150,000 first-prize money.

The tournament was highlighted by the presence of Jennifer Capriati, who returned to professional tennis after a 14-month hiatus. Her last match was at the first round of the 1993 US Open, where she lost to Leila Meskhi. Capriati will eventually lost in the first round against tournament winner Anke Huber, in what would end up being her only match in the entire 1994 season.

Finals

Singles

 Anke Huber defeated  Mary Pierce 6–0, 6–7(4–7), 7–5
 It was Huber's 3rd singles title of the year and the 6th of her career.

Doubles

 Gigi Fernández /  Natasha Zvereva defeated  Gabriela Sabatini /  Brenda Schultz 4–6, 6–4, 6–2

References

External links
 ITF tournament edition details
 Tournament draws

Virginia Slims of Philadelphia
Advanta Championships of Philadelphia
Virginia Slims of Philadelphia
Virginia Slims of Philadelphia
Virginia Slims of Philadelphia